Óscar Andres Rivas Torres (born 6 June 1987) is a Colombian professional boxer who has held the WBC bridgerweight title from 2021 to 2023. He also challenged for the vacant WBC interim heavyweight title in 2019, and previously held the IBF International, WBC-NABF and WBO-NABO heavyweight titles. As an amateur he won a silver medal at the 2007 Pan American Games.

Amateur career
In Cartagena at the 2006 Caribbean Games, the 212 lbs Rivas lost in the first round to Cuban Olympic Bronze medalist Michel López Núñez 4:6 

4 February 2007 at a PanAm qualifier Rivas scored his first big win by beating two-time American champ Mike Wilson 24:19 but lost to Cuban Robert Alfonso 12:21.
In the Pan-American main event in Rio he beat Gerardo Bisbal 22:8, Didier Bence by walkover (injured) and reached the final but lost to Alfonso once again, this time 4:8.

In Chicago, at the 2007 AIBA World Boxing Championships he stopped Dominican Lequan Carlisle but lost to eventual silver medalist Vyacheslav Glazkov 7:23.

At the first Olympic qualifier in March 2008, he lost to American Michael Hunter Jr.; however, in April 2008 he qualified for the 2008 Olympics through the second American qualifier with a 16:4 over Mexican Andy Ruiz Jr. and a 6:5 victory over Brazilian Gleison Abreu.

At the Olympics he upset European champion Kubrat Pulev of Bulgaria 11:5, but lost to Italian world champion and eventual Olympic champion Roberto Cammarelle 5:9.

Professional career

Heavyweight

Early career 
Rivas turned pro in 2009 for Yvon Michel in Canada. After compiling a perfect record of 20-0, he captured the vacant NABF heavyweight title in his 21st fight after beating former world title challenger Carl Davis Drumond by first-round knockout on 28 September 2017, with the stoppage coming just 68 seconds into the fight.

Rivas vs. Jennings 
After four more consecutive wins, Rivas defeated former WBA interim heavyweight champion Bryant Jennings via twelfth-round technical knockout in his 26th fight on 18 January 2019 to win the IBF International and WBO-NABO heavyweight titles. Jennings was a highly ranked heavyweight at the time, ranked at #2 by the WBO, #7 by the WBA, #8 by the IBF and #14 by the WBC.

Rivas vs. Whyte 

With an undefeated record of 26-0, Rivas challenged Dillian Whyte for the vacant WBC interim heavyweight title. Whyte was ranked #1 by the WBC and #3 by the WBA and WBO at heavyweight. Rivas knocked Whyte down in the ninth round with a right uppercut, but he ultimately lost the fight by unanimous decision with scores of 116–112, 115–111, 115–111.

Bridgerweight

Cancelled Jennings rematch 
Rivas was scheduled to meet Bryant Jennings on 18 June 2021 in Canada in a rematch of their 2019 fight for the inaugural WBC bridgerweight title, but the fight was postponed and ultimately cancelled.

Rivas vs. Louis 
On 16 March, 2021, Rivas fought Sylvera Louis. Rivas won the fight within three rounds via TKO.

Rivas vs. Rozicki 
On 22 October 2021, Rivas outpointed undefeated Ryan Rozicki to a unanimous decision with scores of 116–111 and 115–112 twice to become the inaugural WBC bridgerweight champion.

Personal life 
Rivas was born in Buenaventura, Colombia, and resides in Montreal, Quebec.

Professional boxing record

References

External links
 
2008 Olympics results
Oscar Rivas - Profile, News Archive & Current Rankings at Box.Live

Living people
1987 births
Heavyweight boxers
Boxers at the 2007 Pan American Games
Bridgerweight boxers
Boxers at the 2008 Summer Olympics
Olympic boxers of Colombia
Colombian male boxers
Pan American Games silver medalists for Colombia
Pan American Games medalists in boxing
Medalists at the 2007 Pan American Games
World Boxing Council champions
People from Buenaventura, Valle del Cauca
Sportspeople from Valle del Cauca Department
21st-century Colombian people